Valley Metro, the operational name for the Greater Roanoke Transit Company, is a local government-owned urban-suburban bus line based in Roanoke, Virginia with First Transit providing the general and assistant general managers. The staff is employed by Southwest Virginia Transit Management Company, a First Transit subsidiary. Valley Metro serves the independent cities of Roanoke and Salem, the town of Vinton, and limited unincorporated portions of Roanoke County.  Valley Metro has a fleet of 42 buses and 7 paratransit vehicles, and many lines originate and/or terminate at Campbell Court, a central bus station in downtown Roanoke which is also served by Greyhound.

Services offered

Bus 
Effective June 1, 2010, Valley Metro buses only stop at designated bus stops. Before as previous to this buses would stop at every corner. Many passengers have expressed disapproval of this new policy. Valley Metro officials state that the changes are necessary to keep buses on schedule as ridership has increased.

As of January 1, 2018, Valley Metro operates the following bus routes:
11&12: Valley View Mall to Campbell Court via Hershberger/Cove Roads
15&16: Valley View Mall to Campbell Court via Grandview/Greenland Avenues
21&22: Crossroads Mall to Campbell Court via Williamson Road
25&26: Crossroads Mall to Campbell Court via Hollins/Hershberger Roads
31&32: Vinton to Campbell Court via Campbell Avenue/King Street
31X: Roanoke Centre for Industry and Technology (RCIT) to Campbell Court via Orange Avenue (only operates during rush hour)
35&36: Vinton to Campbell Court via Dale/Washington Avenues
41&42: Southeast Roanoke to Campbell Court
51&52: Tanglewood Mall to Campbell Court via Avenham Avenue/Jefferson Street
55&56: Tanglewood Mall to Campbell Court via Franklin Rd/Colonial Ave
61&62: Brambleton/Red Rock to Campbell Court
65&66: Carlton/Grandin to Campbell Court
71&72: LewisGale Hospital to Campbell Court
75&76: Veterans Hospital to Campbell Court
81&82: Lakeside Plaza Salem to Campbell Court via Melrose Avenue (only operates during rush hour)
85&86: Peters Creek Road to Campbell Court
91&92: Goodwill Industries in Salem to Campbell Court via LewisGale Hospital, Veterans Hospital, and Melrose Avenue

Smart Way Bus 
Valley Metro operates the Smart Way Bus, which serves Roanoke, Christiansburg, Blacksburg, and Virginia Tech. Its service to Roanoke includes connections to the Amtrak station, which opened on October 31, 2017.

Star Line Trolley 
The Star Line Trolley is a free service along Jefferson Street between downtown Roanoke and the Carilion Roanoke Memorial Hospital. Service is from 7:00 AM to 7:00 PM Monday through Friday.

Civic Center Shuttles 
Free shuttles run from the Elmwood Garage in downtown Roanoke to the Roanoke Civic Center during events.

Paratransit (S.T.A.R.) 
Valley Metro offers a paratransit service called Specialized Transit - Arranged Rides (S.T.A.R.), operated by RADAR Transit, for individuals with disabilities who are unable to ride a traditional Valley Metro bus. It serves the entire city of Roanoke, the town of Salem, and the city of Salem. Applications must be submitted in order to ride. Customers call at least one day in advance to reserve a ride.

References

External links
 Valley Metro
 Smart Way Bus

Bus transportation in Virginia
Transportation in Roanoke, Virginia